Brachyglene is a genus of moths of the family Notodontidae. It consists of the following species:
Brachyglene albicephala  Miller, 2008
Brachyglene bracteola  (Geyer, 1832) 
Brachyglene caenea  (Drury, 1782) 
Brachyglene crocearia  (Schaus, 1912) 
Brachyglene fracta  Miller, 2008
Brachyglene patinata  Prout, 1918
Brachyglene schausi  Prout, 1918
Brachyglene subtilis  (C. and R. Felder, 1874) 
Brachyglene superbior (Strand, 1912)
Brachyglene thirmida  Hering, 1925

Notodontidae of South America